Mohammad-Ali Rahmani is an Iranian Shi'a cleric and politician. He was appointed as head of Basij on 16 February 1984 by Mohsen Rezaei and served in the capacity until January 1990.

Rahmani is a member of Association of Combatant Clerics.

References

Living people
Association of Combatant Clerics politicians
Islamic Revolutionary Guard Corps clerics
Year of birth missing (living people)
People from Quchan